Pascal Foser (born 16 October 1992) is a Liechtensteiner footballer who currently plays for FC Triesenberg.

International career
He was a member of the Liechtenstein national football team, making his debut in a friendly match against Iceland on 6 June 2016. Foser also made eight appearances for the Liechtenstein U21 team between 2012 and 2014.

References

1992 births
Living people
Liechtenstein footballers
FC Balzers players
Liechtenstein international footballers
Association football defenders